Mohammad Qaseem Osmani (born 1969 in Bukan, West Azerbaijan) is an Iranian politician which representing Bukan since 2008 election. He is also a member of the Planning and Budget Commission and computation, Ph.D. accounting faculty Shahid Beheshti University, and author of some academic books accounting in Persian in Iran.

He was in top five nominations for the director of Supreme Audit Court position in 2013. However, he withdrew to take the office because of requests to remain in his seat in the parliament.

On 17 November 2019, Osmani resigned from the parliament in protest against Speaker Ali Larijani's decision to raise fuel prices, which sparked the 2019–20 Iranian protests.

References

People from Bukan
Deputies of Bukan
1969 births
Members of the 9th Islamic Consultative Assembly
Members of the 8th Islamic Consultative Assembly
Living people
Iranian Kurdish politicians
Shahid Beheshti University alumni
Members of the 10th Islamic Consultative Assembly
Followers of Wilayat fraction members
Academic staff of Shahid Beheshti University